Riya Vij is an Indian actress. She made her debut in Karan Johar's 2013 children feature movie Gippi.

Early life 
Vij was born on 14 December 1998 in Delhi, India to a Punjabi family. She completed her schooling from Sanskriti School and is currently pursuing her graduation from Shaheed Sukhdev College of Business Studies.

Filmography

References

External links 

Living people
Indian film actresses
1998 births